The 1999 Texas Longhorns football team represented the University of Texas at Austin during the 1999 NCAA Division I-A football season. They were represented in the Big 12 Conference in the South Division. They played their home games at Darrell K Royal–Texas Memorial Stadium in Austin, Texas. The team was coached by head coach Mack Brown.

Schedule
The Longhorns finished the regular season with a 9–3 record and won the Big 12 South Championship. During the regular season,  Texas upset #3 Nebraska in Austin, Texas. However, they lost a re-match with the Big 12 North Champions, Nebraska in the 1999 Big 12 Championship Game, 22–6. They were also defeated by former arch-rival Arkansas in the 2000 Cotton Bowl Classic, 27–6.

Roster

Rankings

Game summaries

NC State

Kansas State

Source: Box Score

Nebraska

Source: Box Score

Texas Tech

at Texas A&M

This rivalry game would unite the two schools for the year, due to the tragic collapse of Texas A&M's bonfire the week prior to the game. A sellout crowd was met with an awe-inspiring halftime performance from both schools.

References

Texas
Texas Longhorns football seasons
Texas Longhorns football